Gu Sang-Bum (born June 15, 1964) is a former South Korean football player in defender role.

He played mostly for clubs LG Cheetahs, Daewoo Royals and Pohang Atoms.

For the South Korea national football team he participated at two FIFA World Cups, in 1990 and 1994.

Honours

Player
Lucky-Goldstar Hwangso / LG Cheetahs
 K-League Winners (1): 1990
 K-League Runners-up (1) : 1986, 1989
 Korean National Football Championship Winners (1) : 1988

Individual
K-League Best XI : 1987 (DF)
K-League All-Star Game : 1991, 1995

Club career statistics

International goals
Results list South Korea's goal tally first.

External links
 
 
 

1964 births
Living people
Association football defenders
South Korean footballers
South Korea international footballers
FC Seoul players
Busan IPark players
Pohang Steelers players
K League 1 players
1988 AFC Asian Cup players
1990 FIFA World Cup players
1994 FIFA World Cup players
Footballers at the 1988 Summer Olympics
Olympic footballers of South Korea
Footballers from Seoul
Asian Games medalists in football
Footballers at the 1990 Asian Games
Asian Games bronze medalists for South Korea
Medalists at the 1990 Asian Games